Dignified death, death with dignity, dying with dignity or dignity in dying is an ethical concept that refers to the end-of-life process avoiding suffering and maintaining control and autonomy. In general, it is usually treated as an extension of the concept of dignified life, in which people retain their dignity and freedom until the end of their existence.

Although a dignified death can be natural and without any type of assistance, the concept is frequently associated with the right to die, as well as with the defense of the legalization of practices such as voluntary euthanasia, physician-assisted suicide, terminal sedation or the refusal of medical assistance. According to its defenders, the possibility of this type of practices would be what would guarantee a dignified death, keeping free decisions until the last moment and avoiding an unnecessary agony.

See also 
 Death with dignity (disambiguation)
 Right to die
 Assisted dying (disambiguation)

References

Death
Bioethics